Pir Sadar al-Din (Sadardin) or Pir Sadruddin was a fourteenth-century Nizari Ismaili da'i and is regarded as the founder of the Khoja Nizari Ismaili community, also called Satpanth.

He was the son and successor of Pir Shihab al-Din, and was one of the most prominent Ismaili authors of the 14th century. He was a contemporary of the Nizari Ismaili Imam Islam Shah.

Born in Persia, Sadardin later travelled to South Asia, settled in the Sindh area (in what is now southern Pakistan),  founded the Khoja community and developed the Khojki script; he also wrote ginans. Pir Sadardin composed the previous Du'a, which was recited by Ismailis during several centuries, was very long and took almost half an hour to be recited. His "Gat Paj ji Dua" also summarized the story of Creation.

Pir Sadar al-Din's ginans were the last of the ginans that have been studied today to mention Alamut or Daylam, suggesting that until this time, Ismaili presence – which is commonly thought to have been obliterated after the fall of Alamut to the Mongols in 1256 –  had remained in the regions of Alamut and Daylam until his life time the 14th century.

Works
 Aradh
 Athar Ved
 Bawan Ghati
 Bawan bodth, so Kirya and Sahi Samrani
 Budh Avatar
 Buj Nirinjan
 Das Avatar
 Du'a
 Gayantri
 Ginan
 Girbhavali
 Girbhavali
 Khat Darshan
 Khat Nirinjan
 Saloko
 Surat Samacha
 Vinod

References

Sindhi people
Khoja Ismailism
Sindhi-language poets
Sindhi-language writers